Christopher's Diary: Echoes of Dollanganger is a 2015 gothic fiction novel by V.C. Andrews based on her Dollanganger series. It is the second installment of a set of novels that are spin-offs to the Dollanganger Saga. It is a sequel to Christopher's Diary: Secrets of Foxworth.

Plot
The story is set after the last book in the Dollanganger series Garden of Shadows and Christopher's Diary: Secrets of Foxworth.  The father of 17-year-old Kristin Masterwood has been hired to renovate Foxworth Hall after it was abandoned after Seeds of Yesterday. While accompanying him during the renovation, she discovers the remains of Christopher Dollanganger's diary which records, in detail, the events of his and his siblings' captivity in the attic (first covered in the book Flowers in the Attic). Kristen and her boyfriend then go on to re-enact these events, and more secrets from the previous books are revealed. They find out more about the family and the person rebuilding Foxworth Hall.

Summary
Kristin Masterwood's mother was distantly related to the notorious Foxworth family—but she died when Kristin was a child, leaving her daughter to wonder how the ancestral link might affect her. Now that Kristin is the sole possessor of Christopher's diary, the story of the abandoned estate has her enthralled. Watching Christopher and his sister Cathy's forbidden love blossom is overwhelming, and shocking revelations about the family are more potent than she ever could have imagined. And when her boyfriend urges her to give in to desires as tempting and dangerous as those from the attic, the twisted world of the Dollangangers becomes Kristin's own burning obsession....

Sequel
The book is directly succeeded by Christopher's Diary: Secret Brother.

References

American gothic novels
Novels by V. C. Andrews
2015 American novels
Gallery Books books